Tying may refer to:
Fly tying, process of producing an artificial fly
Knot tying, techniques of fastening ropes
Tying (commerce), making customer buy one thing to get another
tying or knotting, part of canine reproduction

See also
Tie (disambiguation)